Oberaufseherin Margarete Gallinat (born 1894, date of death unknown) was the chief supervisor at Kamp Vught, Netherlands. She later became a supervisor at Ravensbrück concentration camp.

Life
Gallinat was born in 1894 in East Prussian Puntigam.

Work as Oberaufseherin
In April 1940, Gallinat read a newspaper ad for Aufseherin and decided to apply. Two months later she started in Ravensbrück, where she worked until the summer of 1943, eventually becoming deputy Oberaufseherin.

References

1894 births
Year of death missing
Female guards in Nazi concentration camps
Place of birth missing
Ravensbrück concentration camp personnel